, better known by her ring name , often stylized as MIZUKI, is a Japanese professional wrestler. She is currently signed to DDT Pro-Wrestling, where she is formerly one-fifth of the KO-D 10-Man Tag Team Champions, as well as Tokyo Joshi Pro Wrestling, where she is the current Princess of Princess Championship in her first reign and a former Princess Tag Team Champion.

Professional wrestling career

Tokyo Joshi Pro Wrestling (2017–present) 
On April 8, 2017, Mizuki made her debut at Tokyo Joshi Pro Wrestling (TJPW) where she defeated Maki Ito. In July, Mizuki participated in the annual Tokyo Princess Cup where she advanced to the semi-final where she was defeated by Yuka Sakazaki on July 30, who was the Tokyo Princess of Princess Champion at the time. Mizuki teamed with Ito in a tournament to crown the inaugural Tokyo Princess Tag Team Champions, where they lost in the semi-final to the team of Sakazaki and Shoko Nakajima on September 16.

In 2018, Mizuki, along with Sakazaki formed a team named "Magical Sugar Rabbits". The two faced each other again on June 9 in the Tokyo Princess Cup, where Mizuki lost to Sakazaki in the first round. On August 25, 2018, Magical Sugar Rabbits defeated Ito and Reika Saiki to win the vacant Princess Tag Team Championship. Magical Sugar Rabbits had their first successful title defense on October 8, when they defeated Bakuretsu Sisters (Nodoka Tenma and Yuki Aino).

On June 8, 2019, Magical Sugar Rabbits lost the Princess Tag Team Championshipm to Neo Biishiki-gun (Misao and Saki Akai), ending their reign at 287 days with 6 successful title defenses. On July 7, Mizuki won the Tokyo Princess Cup after defeating Yuna Manase in the finals. After winning the Tokyo Princess Cup, Mizuki challenged Nakajima, who was then the Princess of Princess Champion, on September 1, but was unsuccessful.

On August 29, 2020, Mizuki won the Tokyo Princess Cup for the second year in a row after defeating Nakajima in the finals, making her the only wrestler to win the Cup back-to-back. On November 7, at the main event of Wrestle Princess Mizuki challenged her own tag team partner Sakazaki for the Princess of Princess Championship, but was unsuccessful. On November 14, Mizuki officially signed to TJPW. On March 18, 2023, at Grand Princess '23, Mizuki defeated Sakazaki to win the Princess of Princess Championship for the first time.

Championships and accomplishments 
 DDT Pro-Wrestling
 KO-D 10-Man Tag Team Championship (1 time) - with Danshoku Dino, Yuki Iino, Asuka and Trans-Am Hiroshi
 Ironman Heavymetalweight Championship (1 time)
 Gatoh Move Pro Wrestling
 Asia Dream Tag Team Championship (1 time) - with Saki
 Tokyo Joshi Pro Wrestling
 Princess of Princess Championship (1 time, current)
 Tokyo Princess Tag Team Championship (1 time) – with Yuka Sakazaki (1)
 Tokyo Princess Cup (2019, 2020)

References 

1995 births
Living people
Sportspeople from Kobe
Japanese female professional wrestlers
21st-century professional wrestlers
Ironman Heavymetalweight Champions
KO-D 8-Man/10-Man Tag Team Champions